Ancylometes rufus is a species from the genus Ancylometes. The species was originally described by Charles Athanase Walckenaer in 1837. It is typically found near water. It has been seen predating on frogs, Dendropsophus melanargyreus  and Ameerega trivittata

References

    

Taxa named by Charles Athanase Walckenaer